The Martha organisation (Finnish: Marttaliitto, Swedish: Martharörelsen) is a Finnish organisation, founded by Lucina Hagman in 1899. The organisation defines its activities as follows: "The Martha organisation is a citizens' organisation providing advice in home economics, with the aim of furthering welfare in homes and families, and providing diverse activities and possibilities of influencing the community to its members." The Martha organisation takes its name from the Biblical figure of Martha.

The organisation has a three-tier structure. The lowest tier consists of local Martha communities and clubs, which the members belong to. These communities belong to regional Martha suborganisations. The Martha organisation itself is the statewide central organisation. The members of the Martha organisation, called Martta, number about 50 000. The Martha communities now also accept male members. They are called Martti or Matti.

Whereas the organisation's activity was previously focused mainly on the countryside, the organisation has lately sought to expand to cities. University students have also formed Martha communities. Men have founded Martti clubs. The Swedish clubs for their own nationwide organisation called Marthaförbundet.

The organisation publishes a magazine called Martat that comes out six times a year. The magazine was formerly named Emäntälehti Martat.

References

External links
 Official site

Non-profit organisations based in Finland
Women's organisations based in Finland